Joseph Connor Phillips (born January 17, 1962) is an American actor, writer, and conservative Christian commentator. He is best known for his role as Martin Kendall on the long-running NBC sitcom The Cosby Show, and as Justus Ward on the soap opera General Hospital.

Career
After graduating from the Professional Theatre Training Program at New York University, Phillips appeared on stage in theatre productions at the Manhattan Bridge Company, Philadelphia Festival Theatre for New Plays, Repertory Theatre of St. Louis, and a starring role in the world premiere of Toni Morrison's Dreaming Emmett at Capital Repertory Theatre in 1986. 

Amid radio and television commercials, Phillips landed a guest role on the soap opera Search for Tomorrow and a second-season appearance on the popular NBC sitcom The Cosby Show. Four years later, he returned to The Cosby Show in his most notable role, that of U.S. Navy Lieutenant Martin Kendall, which he portrayed from 1989-1991.  

He portrayed attorney Justus Ward on the ABC soap opera General Hospital from 1994 to 1998.  Phillips was also a guest political commentator on News & Notes on most NPR radio stations between 2004 and 2009.

Education and associations
Phillips is a member of Alpha Phi Alpha fraternity.  He attended the University of the Pacific as a communications major, but later transferred to the acting conservatory at New York University where he graduated with a BFA in acting in 1983.

Phillips is an ambassador for the Sickle Cell Disease Association of America.  He has spoken extensively about the disease and its effect on the family. He is also a member of the Screen Actors Guild, American Federation of Television and Radio Artists, Actors Equity Association, the Academy of Television Arts and Sciences, was National Co-Chair of the African American Steering committee for Bush Cheney '04, was named a member of the Republican National Committee's African American Advisory Board, was appointed by Governor Arnold Schwarzenegger to the state board of directors of the California African American Museum and was named a 2005 Claremont Institute Lincoln Fellow.

In 2022, Phillips joined the faculty of Clark Atlanta University as a professor in the theatre and communications department.

Conservative activism
Phillips, a Republican, is a television and radio commentator and has written a weekly syndicated column that promotes conservative views. He has been a critic of affirmative action and same-sex marriage in the United States. His book, He Talk Like a White Boy, reflects his thoughts in this regard.

Personal life
Joseph Phillips' mother died when he was young. After this, he became close to the mother of Duane Evans, his cousin. Phillips is from Colorado. He and his wife Nicole have three sons, Connor, Ellis, and Samuel. In 2006, Phillips published an autobiography, He Talk Like A White Boy, which includes a foreword by Tavis Smiley.

Filmography 
n.b. for credit listings reference

Awards and nominations

See also
 Black conservatism in the United States

References

External links

  
 
 
 

1962 births
20th-century American male actors
21st-century American male actors
African-American Christians
African-American male actors
American columnists
American male film actors
American male soap opera actors
American male television actors
American political commentators
Clark Atlanta University faculty
Colorado Republicans
Living people
Male actors from Denver
Tisch School of the Arts alumni